Carsonville is an unincorporated community in Jefferson Township, Dauphin County, Pennsylvania, United States and is part of the Harrisburg-Carlisle Metropolitan Statistical Area.

Carsonville was formerly the site of a post office.

References

External links 
Carsonville Profile

Harrisburg–Carlisle metropolitan statistical area
Unincorporated communities in Dauphin County, Pennsylvania
Unincorporated communities in Pennsylvania